Zolwerknapp is a hill in the commune of Sanem, in south-western Luxembourg.

References

Sanem
Mountains and hills of Luxembourg